Events in the year 2007 in Cyprus.

Incumbents 

 President: Demetris Christofias
 President of the Parliament: Yiannakis Omirou

Events 
Ongoing – Cyprus dispute

 18 August – An Atlas Jet plane en route from Nicosia to Istanbul was hijacked. Some passengers were freed while the plane refueled in Antalya, southern Turkey, and all 142 people on board escape unhurt after the hijackers surrendered.

Deaths

References 

 
2000s in Cyprus
Years of the 21st century in Cyprus
Cyprus
Cyprus
Cyprus